C.O.D. (also known as Children of Doom) is the sixth studio album by the American doom metal band Saint Vitus. The album was released in 1992 on Hellhound Records. This is the only album to feature former Count Raven vocalist Christian Linderson. The band had a break after this album, but reformed with original singer Scott Reagers for their next album, Die Healing (1995).

Track listing 
All songs written by Dave Chandler, except "Planet of Judgement" by Saint Vitus (lyrics by Armando Acosta and Christian Linderson), and "Imagination Man" by Mark Adams, Chandler and Acosta (lyrics by Chandler).

 "Intro" - 1:47
 "Children of Doom" - 6:07
 "Planet of Judgement" - 7:39
 "Shadow of a Skeleton" - 5:55
 "(I Am) The Screaming Banshee" - 3:48
 "Plague of Man" - 8:01
 "Imagination Man" - 4:25
 "Fear" - 4:58
 "Get Away" - 7:23
 "Bela" - 5:58
 "A Timeless Tale" - 2:17
 "Hallow's Victim (Exhumed)" - 4:03

Personnel 
Saint Vitus
 Christian Linderson - vocals
 Dave Chandler - guitar, vocals and keyboards on "A Timeless Tale"
 Mark Adams - bass
 Armando Acosta - drums

Additional musicians
Mimi Anderson - backing vocals on "A Timeless Tale"

Production
Don Dokken - producer
Ulf Henriksen - engineer

References 

Saint Vitus (band) albums
1992 albums
Hellhound Records albums